Muang Phiang is a town in Sainyabuli Province, Laos. It is located along the main road (Route 4, southwest of Sainyabuli. The area surrounding it is mainly paddy fields.

References

Populated places in Sainyabuli Province